This article is about the fourth cabinet of the first Prime Minister of Malaysia, Tunku Abdul Rahman. He announced his cabinet on 21 May 1969, eight days after the 13 May incident, and eleven days after the 1969 Malaysian general election, where his Alliance only won by a slim majority. It was the 4th cabinet of Malaysia formed since independence. This was the final government headed by Tunku Abdul Rahman, although in reality the government was suspended and de facto replaced by National Operations Council or MAGERAN on 15 May. Tunku Abdul Rahman resigned from his position a year later, succeeded by his deputy  and the MAGERAN Director, Abdul Razak Hussein.

Composition

Full members
The federal cabinet consisted of the following ministers:

Assistant ministers

See also
 Members of the Dewan Rakyat, 3rd Malaysian Parliament
 National Operations Council

References

Cabinet of Malaysia
1969 establishments in Malaysia
1970 disestablishments in Malaysia
Cabinets established in 1969
Cabinets disestablished in 1970